Goodbye, Columbus is a 1969 American romantic comedy-drama film starring Richard Benjamin and Ali MacGraw, directed by Larry Peerce and based on the 1959 novella of the same name by Philip Roth. The screenplay, by Arnold Schulman, won the Writers Guild of America Award.

The story's title alludes to a phonograph record played by the brother of MacGraw's character, nostalgically recalling his athletic career at Ohio State in Columbus. The film was essentially MacGraw's film debut, as she had previously had only a "bit part" in the previous year's A Lovely Way to Die.

Plot
Neil Klugman is an intelligent, working-class army veteran and a graduate of Rutgers University who works as a library clerk. He falls for Brenda Patimkin, a wealthy Radcliffe student who is home for the summer. They meet by the swimming pool at Old Oaks Country Club in Purchase, New York, a private club that Neil visits as a guest of his cousin Doris. Neil phones Brenda and asks her on a date. She does not remember him, but agrees. He waits as she finishes a tennis game that ends only when it gets too dark to play.

They face obstacles from Brenda's family (particularly her mother), due to differences in class and assimilation into the American mainstream. Brenda's family are nouveau riche, their money having come from the successful plumbing supply business owned and run by her father. Brenda herself is old enough to remember "being poor". Other conflicts include propriety and issues related to premarital sex and the possibility of pregnancy, and Mrs. Patimkin's envy of her daughter's youth.

After a few dates, Brenda persuades her father to allow Neil to stay with them for two weeks, angering her mother, who feels that she should have been asked instead. While Neil enjoys being able to sneak into Brenda's room at night, he has misgivings over her entitled outlook, echoed by her spoiled and petulant younger sister, and her naïve brother Ron, who misses the hero worship he enjoyed as a star basketball player at Ohio State University. Neil is astonished when Brenda reveals that she does not take birth control pills or use any other precautions to avoid pregnancy, angrily waving off Neil's concerns. He prepares to leave, but she decides to persuade him to stay by agreeing to get a diaphragm.

At the end of his stay, Neil attends Ron's wedding to Harriet, his college sweetheart from Ohio. Brenda returns to Radcliffe in the fall, keeping in touch by telephone. She invites Neil to come up to spend a weekend at a Boston hotel. However, once they're in the hotel room, Brenda tells Neil she just received letters telling her that her mother found her diaphragm and that her parents know about their affair. They argue, with Neil asking why she left it to be found unless she wanted it discovered. Siding with her parents, Brenda ends the affair as abruptly as she allowed it to commence. Neil walks out of the hotel, leaving her crying in the room.

Cast
 Richard Benjamin as Neil Klugman
 Ali MacGraw as Brenda Patimkin
 Jack Klugman as Ben Patimkin
 Nan Martin as Mrs. Ben Patimkin
 Michael Meyers as Ron Patimkin
 Lori Shelle as Julie Patimkin
 Monroe Arnold as Uncle Leo
 Kay Cummings as Doris Klugman
 Sylvie Strause as Aunt Gladys
 Ilona Simon as Gloria Feldman
 Royce Wallace as Carlotta, the African-American cook and housekeeper at the Patimkin home.
 Mari Gorman as Simp (Laura Simpson Sockaloe)

Production
The film was shot in Westchester County, New York, The Bronx in New York City and Cambridge, Massachusetts. The interior library scenes were filmed in Gould Memorial Library on the campus of Bronx Community College and the exterior library scenes were filmed at Yonkers Public Library in Westchester County (which was controversially demolished in 1982). The film was shot on location on the campus of Radcliffe College in Cambridge, Massachusetts.

Reception

Box-office
The film earned an estimated $10.5 million in ticket sales at the North American box office, making it one of the most popular movies of the year.

Critical response
Variety magazine lauded the film upon its release, writing, "This adaptation of Philip Roth's National Book Award-winning novella is sometimes a joy in striking a boisterous mood, and otherwise handling the action. Castwise the feature excels. Richard Benjamin as the boy, a librarian after serving in the army, and Ali MacGraw, making her screen bow as the daughter of wealthy and socially-conscious parents, offer fresh portrayals seasoned with rich humor. Their romance develops swiftly after their meeting at a country-club pool."

The New York Times film critic, Vincent Canby, liked the film but was annoyed that it strayed from Roth's work. Canby wrote:Thus, at its center, Goodbye, Columbus is sharp and honest. However, the further they are removed from the main situation, the more the subsidiary characters, lightly sketched in the novella, become overstuffed, blintz-shaped caricatures. Jack Klugman and Nan Martin, as Brenda's parents, are very nice, but Michael Meyers, as her huge, empty-headed brother ('so exceedingly polite,' Mr. Roth observed in the novella, 'that it seemed to be some affliction of those over six foot three') borders on a cartoon figure. Also, I somehow resent the really vulgar manners that Mr. Peerce allows his middle-class Jews—especially at an elaborate wedding reception—not because of any particular bias, but because it is gross moviemaking. These reservations, however, become academic. Goodbye, Columbus is so rich with understanding in more important ways that it is a thing of real and unusual pleasure.Critic Dennis Schwartz praised the film as well, writing, "Philip Roth's prize-winning novella, a scathing satire of a nouveau riche Jewish family, has been brilliantly adapted for the screen by Arnold Schulman (received an Academy nomination) and directed by Larry Peerce (son of the great operatic tenor Jan Peerce). Somehow it slipped under the radar and as far as I'm concerned is both funnier and more perceptive than even The Graduate, an earlier drama about young adults."

Accolades

Soundtrack

A vinyl LP record of the film's score was released in 1969 by Warner Bros. Records and a compact disc was released in 2006 by Collector's Choice Music.

Three songs in the soundtrack were written and performed by members of The Association: "Goodbye, Columbus" (Jim Yester), "It's Gotta Be Real" (Larry Ramos), and "So Kind To Me" (Terry Kirkman).

Track listing
 Goodbye, Columbus [Vocal Version]
 How Will I Know You?
 Dartmouth? Dartmouth!
 Goodbye, Columbus [Instrumental]
 Ron's Reverie: Across the Field/Carmen Ohio
 It's Gotta Be Real
 A Moment to Share
 Love Has a Way
 A Time for Love
 So Kind to Me (Brenda's Theme)
 Goodbye, Columbus

Cast notes
The film was the only acting role for Michael Meyers, who later became a physician. He was cast as Ron (the brother of Ali MacGraw's character) after director Larry Peerce "discovered" him at a wedding in New York's Plaza Hotel. In 1976, he published a memoir about his involvement in the film and his subsequent medical career, Goodbye Columbus, Hello Medicine. Michael Meyers drowned in the ocean September 14, 2009 in Los Angeles County.

See also

 List of American films of 1969

References

External links

 
 
 
 Goodbye, Columbus film analysis by Glenn Erickson
 Goodbye, Columbus film clips at Movieclips
 

1969 films
1960s romantic comedy-drama films
American romantic comedy-drama films
American coming-of-age comedy-drama films
Films about Jews and Judaism
Films based on short fiction
Films directed by Larry Peerce
Films scored by Charles Fox
Films set in New York (state)
Films set in New Jersey
Films shot in New York (state)
Films shot in Massachusetts
Paramount Pictures films
Films based on works by Philip Roth
1969 comedy films
1969 drama films
1960s English-language films
1960s American films